= The Antagonists (comic book) =

American comic book by Tyler F. Martin

Publication information
- Publisher: Godhood Comics
- Format: Ongoing series
- Genre: Superhero
- Publication date: May 2021
- No. of issues: 6
- Main character(s): Calvin Eval; Tonya Eval; Treylan Eval; Aaliyah Eval; Tajj Eval; Sheila English

Creative team
- Created by: Tyler F. Martin
- Written by: Tyler F. Martin
- Artist(s): Giacomo Guida; Matteo Illuminati; Huebert M. Khan
- Letterer: Christian Docolomansky

The Antagonists (also known as Tyler Martin's The Antagonists) is an American comic book series created and written by Tyler F. Martin, and published by Godhood Comics.

== Premise ==
Twenty years after bringing the United States to its knees, supervillains Destructus and Ultima have gone into hiding and settled down, raising three children and assimilating into civilian life. However, their family is threatened by sinister powers that force Destructus and Ultima to face their bloody past and unite their family to face dangerous adversaries: both new and old.

== Characters ==
- Calvin Eval - The Eval family patriarch and formerly the supervillain Destructus. He is a powerful telepath and expert tactician with a genius-level intellect who is now a high school principal. He is depicted as an extremely disciplined man who is compassionate despite his stoic and calculating nature. He was also once the sidekick of the American, a patriotic albeit oblivious superhero.
- Tonya Eval - The Eval family matriarch and formerly the supervillain Ultima. She possesses superhuman abilities such as super strength, a bulletproof epidermis, and heat vision, among others. Working in commercial real estate, Tonya is a skilled combatant with a short temper who is fiercely protective of her family.
- Treylan - The eldest Eval child. Trey is an inspiring college student who moonlights as a participant in Detroit's underground fighting ring. He possesses a regenerative healing factor which allows him to withstand injuries that would otherwise critically wound or kill a normal human being.
- Aaliyah - The middle Eval child. Aaliyah is a high school student and cheerleader with a penchant for troublemaking, sharing her mother's tenacity. She possesses a superhuman phasing ability which allows her to become intangible as well as the ability of power mimicry through touch.
- Tajj - The youngest Eval child. Tajj shares a genius-level intellect with his father but is a skilled inventor and scientist.
- Sheila English - A hardened FBI agent with a grudge against Destructus and Ultima due to their actions twenty years prior attributing to the death of her fiancé Francine. Sheila is part of A.C.T.I.O.N. (American Counter-Terrorist Inquiry of Nemesis), an elite government task force formed to hunt and capture supervillains. English possesses formidable combat skills and a strong moral compass, evidenced by her protecting the kids despite them being the children of Destructus and Ultima.

== Collected editions ==
Title	Release date	Material collected	Extras	ISBN
The Antagonists
The Antagonists – Volume 1	August 17, 2022 (TPB)	The Antagonists #1–6		9798218059842 (TPB)

== In other media ==
=== Television ===
In July 2021, Deadline announced that the comic series had been acquired for television adaptation by Braham Entertainment.

== Reception ==
The series has received generally positive reviews with much of its criticism aimed at technical issues. Hannibal Tabu of Bleeding Cool wrote a positive review which made note of these issues, saying, "None of that changes the core quality of the ideas, even with challenges in execution. This book is engaging and interesting". Website Comical Opinions praised the series' artwork and called it a "unique series with great art and storytelling" but posited that the villainous characterization of its lead characters might be off-putting to some readers.
